Richard Sherman Sadler (September 10, 1928 - May 10, 2019) was an American politician in the state of Wyoming. He served in the Wyoming House of Representatives  and Wyoming State Senate as a member of the Democratic Party.

He was previously the director of the Wyoming Employment Security Commission.

References

1928 births
2019 deaths
People from Hawarden, Iowa
Democratic Party Wyoming state senators
Democratic Party members of the Wyoming House of Representatives